The National Indoor Stadium (official name) is an indoor stadium that is located in the Olympic Green in Beijing, China. The stadium has a capacity of 20,000 people, and was constructed for the 2008 Summer Olympics. It is nicknamed the Fan (扇子, shànzi) due to its design resembling a traditional Chinese folding fan.

History
The stadium opened its doors on November 26, 2007, for the artistic Gymnastics test event. It is also used for basketball.

At the 2008 Summer Olympics, it hosted the artistic gymnastics, trampolining, and handball events. After the Olympics, the stadium is used for sports competition, cultural and entertaining purposes, and serves as a multi-functional exercise center for local residents. In 2015 it hosted the ice hockey women's world championship Beijing 2015. The stadium was used for ice hockey during the 2022 Winter Olympics and Paralympics.

See also
List of indoor arenas in China

References

External links 
 
Beijing National Indoor Stadium Official Website

Venues of the 2008 Summer Olympics
Venues of the 2022 Winter Olympics
Indoor arenas in China
Olympic gymnastics venues
Olympic handball venues
Olympic ice hockey venues
Sports venues completed in 2007
Sports venues in Beijing
Handball venues in China